Lansing is a Dutch patronymic surname from the personal name Lans (Germanic Lanzo).  The "-ing" or "-ink" suffix originally was patronymic, but later also became indicative of a place. Lansing is now a rare name in the Netherlands (Lansink is the more common form), but there are many descendants in the United States of Gerrit Gerritse Lansing (ca.1615–bef.1654), a baker in Hasselt, Overijssel, whose widow and children migrated to New Netherland in 1654. At a later time there the surname became used as a middle name and given name. Notable people with the name include:

Surname
Abraham Lansing (1835–1899), New York lawyer and politician
Abraham G. Lansing (1756–1834), New York politician
Alfred Lansing (1921-1975), American journalist and writer
 (1891–1959), American Egyptologist and anthropologist
Bradford R. Lansing (1860–1912), New York politician
Clarabelle Lansing (1930–1988), American flight attendant, sole fatality of the Aloha Airlines Flight 243 disaster
Frederick Lansing (1838–1894), U.S. Representative from New York
Gene Lansing (1898–1945), American baseball pitcher
Gerrit Y. Lansing (1783–1862), U.S. Representative from New York
Greg Lansing (born 1967),  American college basketball coach
Isaac J. Lansing (1846–1920), American pastor and university president
J. Stephen Lansing (born 1950), American anthropologist and complexity scientist
Jacob John Lansing, American sheriff
James Bullough Lansing (1902–1949), American audio engineer
Founder of the companies Altec Lansing and JBL
Jewel Lansing (born 1930), American (Oregon) writer and politician
Jim Lansing (1919–2000), American college football player and coach
John Lansing, Jr. (1754–1829), New York lawyer and politician
Named for him: Lansing, New York and, indirectly, Lansing, Michigan
Joi Lansing (1929–1972), American model, actress and nightclub singer
Marjorie Lansing (1916–1998), American political scientist and feminist
Michael Lansing (born 1994), American soccer goalkeeper
Mike Lansing (born 1968), American baseball second baseman
P. J. Lansing (born 1949), American model
Robert Lansing (1864–1928), United States Secretary of State (1915–1920)
Named for him: the Lansing–Ishii Agreement and U.S. Navy cargo ship SS Robert Lansing
Robert Lansing (actor) (1928–1994), American stage, film and television actor
Robert Lansing (state senator) (1799–1878), New York lawyer and politician
Sherry Lansing (born 1944), American actress and first woman to head a Hollywood studio
William E. Lansing (1821–1883), U.S. Representative from New York
William Henry Lansing (1914–1942), U.S. Navy casualty of World War II

Fictional characters
Lansing family, family of doctors in the General Hospital soap opera, including Ric Lansing and Molly Lansing
Laura Lansing, eponymous character of the 1988 comedy film Laura Lansing Slept Here

Given name
Lansing Hoskins Beach (1860–1945), U.S. Army Chief of Engineers
Lansing Bennett (1926–1993), American physician and shooting victim at the CIA Headquarters
Lansing Brown Jr. (1900–1962), American photographer
Lansing Campbell (1882–1937), American illustrator
Lansing C. Holden (1858–1930), American architect
Lansing Colton Holden Jr. (1896–1938), American World War I flying ace
Lansing Lamont (1930–2013), American journalist
Lansing Leroy Mitchell (1914–2001), United States federal judge
Lansing B. Mizner (1825–1893), American lawyer, diplomat, and politician
Lansing Stout (1828–1871), American politician and lawyer, U.S. Representative for Oregon

Middle name
Richard Lansing Conolly (1892–1962), United States Navy Admiral
Frederic Lansing Day (1890–1981), American playwright
Eleanor Lansing Dulles (1895–1996), American economist and U.S. Department of State official
William Lansing Gleason (1899–1991), American (Florida) mayor
Leroy Lansing Janes (1838–1909), American educator in Japan
Thomas Lansing Masson (1866–1934), American anthropologist, editor and author
Stuart Douglas Lansing Paine (1910–1961), American Antarctic explorer
John Van Schaick Lansing Pruyn (1811–1877), U.S. Representative from New York
George Lansing Raymond (1839–1929), American philosopher

See also
Lensing, surname
Jos Lansink (born 1961), Dutch equestrian
Leonard Lansink (born 1956), German actor

References

Dutch-language surnames
Given names originating from a surname
Patronymic surnames